Ira P. Robbins is an American legal scholar and Professor of Law at American University Washington College of Law, specializing in criminal law. He is the university's Barnard T. Welsh Scholar.

Early life and education
Robbins attended The University of Pennsylvania, where he received an A.B. Robbins later graduated from Harvard Law School, receiving a juris doctor.

Career
Robbins served as a Supreme Court Fellow from 1985 to 1986.

Robbins has been a professor of law at the Washington College of Law since 1979.  Robbins is a member of the NY and DC Bars. Since 1982, Robbins has been the director of the university's J.D./M.S. Joint Degree Program in Justice, Law and Society. Robbins has received many awards at the university due to his teaching and scholarship. At the Washington College of law, Robbins received the University Faculty Award for Outstanding Teaching in 1985 and in 1988, received the award for Scholar/Teacher of the Year, which is American University's  highest faculty award. In 2010, he won the Pauline Ruyle Moore Award, recognizing his scholarly work in the field of public law. In 2011, Robbins was the first recipient of the Washington College of Law Award for Exemplary Teaching. Later, in 2015, Robbins received the Washington College of Law Award for Outstanding Service.

Robbins is a longtime advocate of prisoners' rights, and he has written many law review articles about prisons. He has advocated for prison reform and for emergency planning in prisons. Robbins opposes private prisons, and in 2016, was elected to the Board of Directors of Abolish Private Prisons.

In 2018, Robbins was one of more than 2,400 law professors signing a letter to the United States Senate, asking them not to confirm Supreme Court Justice Brett Kavanaugh. After the 2016 United States presidential election, Robbins signed a letter alongside other faculty members at American University asking students and members of the community to condemn discrimination. In February 2020, Robbins signed a letter submitted to Congress as part of the first impeachment of Donald Trump. Robbins has also contributed on the Supreme Court of the United States Blog.

Robbins is known for his studies regarding the First Amendment, and has been quoted in many articles discussing the use of the finger and freedom of expression. He has stated that, while giving a police officer the finger is "not the smartest thing to do," it is not illegal and a conviction for the gesture would likely not be upheld by the Supreme Court. In 2008, Robbins wrote an 83-page article titled Digitus Impudicus: The Middle Finger and the Law, which discusses the use of the gesture and its relation to the law. Robbins was also featured discussing the gesture in a comedic video for The Colbert Report.

Selected publications

Books
Comparative Postconviction Remedies (D.C. Heath/Lexington Books, 1980). 
The Law and Processes of Postconviction Remedies: Cases and Materials (West Publishing Company, 1982). 
Prisoners Rights Sourcebook: Theory, Litigation, Practice (Clark Boardman Company, Ltd., 1980). 
Prisoners and the Law (six vols., 2019)
Habeas Corpus Checklists (2020)

Articles
Punitive Conditions of Prison Confinement: An Analysis of Pugh v. Locke and Federal Court Supervision of State Penal Administration Under the Eighth Amendment, 29 Stanford Law Review 893 (1977) (with Michael Buser). 
The Legal Dimensions of Private Incarceration (American Bar Association, 1988).
Interjurisdictional Certification and Choice of Law, 41 Vanderbilt Law Review 411 (1988) (with John Corr). 
Double Inchoate Crimes, 26 Harvard Journal on Legislation 1 (1989)
The Ostrich Instruction: Deliberate Ignorance as a Criminal Mens Rea, 81 Journal of Criminal Law and Criminology 191 (1990). 
Toward a More Just and Effective System of Review in State Death Penalty Cases: Recommendatinos and Report of the American Bar Association Task Force on Death Penalty Habeas Corpus (American Bar Association, 1990).
Digitus Impudicus: The Middle Finger and the Law, 41 U.C. DAVIS LAW REVIEW 1403 (2008), reprinted in full in The First Amendment Law Handbook (R. Smolla. ed., 2008–09).

Personal life
Robbins enjoys photography, and enters his photographs into competitions, such as the International Lawyer's Photography Competition.

Awards
Chief Judge John R. Brown Award for Judicial Scholarship and Education (1998)
Elected Life Member of the American Law Institute (2007)

References

External links
Washington College of Law biography

Year of birth missing (living people)
Living people
American legal scholars
University of Kansas faculty
Washington College of Law faculty
Harvard Law School alumni